The 2015 ACB Finals was the championship series of the 2014–15 season of the Liga ACB and the conclusion of the season's playoffs. Real Madrid defeated FC Barcelona in three games (3–0) for the Madrid' seventeenth ACB title and their thirty-second league in team history. Madrid's Sergio Llull was named the Finals Most Valuable Player (MVP).

The Finals was played in the 2–2–1 format (Games 1, 2, and 5 at Madrid, Games 3, and 4, at Barcelona). The series began on June 19, 2015 and ended on June 24, 2015, and was televised in Spain on La 1 and in Catalonia on TV3.

Background

Road to the Finals

Regular season series
The Madrid and Barcelona tied the regular season series 1–1, with each team winning its home game.

Series

Rosters

Real Madrid

FC Barcelona

References

External links
Official website

Finals
FC Barcelona Bàsquet games
Real Madrid Baloncesto games